Australian Tour EP is an EP by José González, released in Australia in 2005.

In South Africa, a CD EP entitled B-Sides Collected was released in November 2006 with an identical track listing, except for the Rocket Boy remix of "Heartbeats". The entire EP was also included as a bonus disc for the special edition of his album, Veneer.

Track listing
"Love Will Tear Us Apart" – 3:02
"Suggestions" – 2:38
"Down the Hillside" – 2:17
"Sensing Owls" – 3:10
"Hand on Your Heart" – 3:47
"Instr." – 6:13
"Storm" – 2:48
"Heartbeats" (Rocket Boy Remix) – 6:14

José González (singer) EPs
2005 EPs
Shock Records EPs